V. Dakshinamoorthy (9 December 1919 – 2 August 2013) was an Indian Carnatic musician and composer of Malayalam, Tamil and Hindi films, predominantly in Malayalam. He has set scores for the songs in over 125 films. He composed as many as 974 songs over a period of 63 years.

Film songs

Prominent Tamil songs

Malayalam songs

References

Discographies of Indian artists